The OTI Festival 1973 was the second edition of the annual OTI Festival. It was held in Belo Horizonte, Brazil, following the country's victory at the 1972 contest with the song "Dialogo" by Claudia Regina and Tobías. Organised by the Organización de Televisión Iberoamericana (OTI) and host broadcaster Rede Tupi, the contest was held at the Palácio das Artes on Saturday 10 November 1973 and was hosted by Walter Forster and Íris Lettieri.

With the debut of México, this time 14 countries participated in the event, one more compared to the first edition in which Mexico had been disqualified. It was precisely the Mexican entrant Imelda Miller with the song "Qué alegre va María" the one who won the festival.

Background 
According to the original rules of the OTI Festival, the winning country of the previous edition would host the contest the next year. Brazil, which was the winning country of the first edition of the festival with the duet composed by Claudia Regina and Tobías and their song "Dialogo" (Dialogue) was, then, designed as the host country. Rede Tupi which was the national broadcaster of the South American state organised the event under the auspices of their affiliate local channel, TV Itacolomi, in the  city of Belo Horizonte in the south-east part of the country.

Venue 

Rede Tupi decided after a committee that Belo Horizonte was the most suitable city in order to host the OTI Festival. This decision was made because of the city's good infrastructure and its readiness for exposition and exhibition purposes. The venue of the festival was the Palacio das Artes, a very modern and vanguardist auditorium which was built by the internationally famous Brazilian architect Oscar Niemeyer and was inaugurated in 1971, two years before the festival took place. The palace which was one of the biggest concert halls in Brazil and Latin America had got a seat capacity for over 2000 people which makes it slightly bigger than the venue of the previous edition in Madrid.

Participating countries 
Fourteen countries took the stage in the second edition of the OTI Festival. The publicly financed and private broadcasters from Spain, Portugal, almost all the South American countries and the Caribbean Islands of the Dominican Republic and Puerto Rico took part. This time, México, which had been disqualified the previous year for political reasons made its debut in the festival with the female singer Imelda Miller, who was selected in the "National Mexican OTI Festival" which was the fastuos and enormously popular national final that Televisa, the Mexican national broadcaster organised every year from then on.

Other countries such as Chile also started creating national events in order to select their entrants to the main festival.

Participating performers 
It must be taken into account the participation of the well known Spanish celebrity Camilo Sesto who was selected by RTVE to represent Spain. Another important part of the festival was the famous Mexican composer Sergio Esquivel, who was the lyricist of "Que alegre va María" (How happy goes María), the Mexican entry which was inspired by his own wife and provided as a gift to the performer Imelda Miller.

Another important contribution was the Bolivian representative, Arturo Quesada, who represented his country for a second consecutive time after his participation in Madrid the previous year. Unfortunately this time, his entry was even less lucky than the previous one.

Presenters 
Walter Forster, who was a recognised actor, voice actor, radio narrator and TV presenter in Brazil was the master of ceremonies, along with Íris Lettieri, a well known TV presenter, model and announcer. Later, she recorded the PA system in the Rio de Janeiro/Galeão International Airport, for which she created a unique style. As in the previous year, the presenters gave a speech that highlighted the goals of the OTI Festival and the goals of the OTI as a general broadcasting organisation. The speech was given mainly in Portuguese, with a few phrases in Spanish. After that, the presenters went on by giving short presentations of the participating performers short before they took the stage.

Running order 
The running order of the performances was decided just like the previous year in a draw that was organised by Rede Tupi in collaboration with the Iberoamerian Television Organisation (OTI) a few days before the start of the festival.

The performance round was started by Panama. The Central American country was represented by Orlando Morales and his song "Soy Feliz" (I'm happy). The host country which was Brazil, represented by Nadinho da Ilha appeared the ninth on stage while the performance round was closed by the Portuguese entrant Paco Bandeira with the song "Poema de mim" (Poem about me).

As happened in last year, almost all the songs that participated in the festival were sung in Spanish except from the Portuguese and Brazilian entries which were sung in Portuguese.

Voting system 
The voting system was the same one that was implemented the previous year. The winner of the festival was chosen by 14 national juries which were composed each one of five members, which made a total number of 65 jurors. Each one of the members of the juries voted only for their favourite entry directly connected by telephone.

The host broadcaster, in this case Rede Tupi called the TV studios of the participating broadcasters in order to know the choice of the jurors. Almost all the countries gave their votes by telephone except from Venezuela, whose broadcaster Venevisión had technical issues during the airing of the event.

Voting process 
All the participating countries had both telephonical and presential juries. Puerto Rico, Venezuela, Dominican Republic and Bolivia had presencial juries in the music hall due to telecommunication problems. The rest of the jurors of the participating countries gave their votes telephonically. Due to the initial tie between Mexico and Peru, the presencial juries were asked to undo the tie. Finally Mexico got the victory.

Result 
The voting process ended with a tie between the Peruvian performer Gabriela de Jesús and her Mexican counterpart Imelda miller. Both entries were tied with ten points each one. This interesting fact makes this edition the only one when a tie between two competing entries happened. The following entry with more points was the one coming from the Dominican Republic while the Brazilian entry ended in the fourth place with seven points.

Unlike the previous year, when five countries were tied in the last place, this year only one country, Bolivia ended in the last position.

In order to break the tie between Mexico and Peru, the most voted entries, Rede Tupi, the host broadcaster and the rest of the participating TV channels needed to improvise during the night a superfinal in order to select the winner.

First result

Superfinal 
During the improvised superfinal that was needed to select the winner and to break the tie between Peru and Mexico, only one juror from each one of the remaining 12 participating countries was able to vote.

Finally, after a tense voting process, Imelda Miller, who represented Mexico, defeated the Peruvian entrant Gabriela de Jesús with only two points difference.

After the final result was known, Imelda Miller as the winner of the first prize, took again the stage and performed her song at the end of the show.

Technical issues 
While the festival was being broadcast in Venezuela, the audio signal was lost and while the technics of Venevisión, the broadcaster, were trying to solve the problem the TV station broadcast ambience music in order to substitute the lack of the original audio signal.

This technical problem didn't let the Venezuelan viewers see the performance of their entrant and for that reason, the Venezuelan juries couldn't send their votes by telephone as did the other countries.

Audience and impact 
As this edition of the OTI Festival was held, unlike the previous one, in the other side of the Atlantic Ocean, where the most of the Spanish and Portuguese speaking countries are, the event reached the screens of a much higher number of people and as a consequence the rating figures were higher. It was estimated that the second edition of this festival was seen in total by over 200 millions of viewers, which was 100 million more than the previous edition.

Mexico, partly thanks to the success of their national final, was again the country where the festival had more viewers to the point that the country was paralysed during the show.

In regards to the participating songs, "Que Alegre va María", the winning song was warmly received by the Mexican audience and launched the career of Imelda Miller in Latin America. Another successful song was the Spanish entry "Algo más" by Camilo Sesto which turned into a smash hit both in Spain and in Latin América.

See also 
 Eurovision Song Contest 1973
 OTI Festival 1972

References

External links 
 

OTI Festival by year
1973 in Latin music
1973 music festivals
Music festivals in Brazil